Musaviyeh may refer to:
 Musaviyeh, Qaen